Kortschak is a surname. Notable people with the surname include:

Hugo Kortschak (1884–1957), Austrian-born American violinist
Hugo P. Kortschak (1911–1983), American biologist, son of Hugo

See also
Korczak (disambiguation)